Avital ( ’Ăḇîṭāl) is a Hebrew given name of Old Testament origin. Traditionally a female given name, its modern usage is unisex.

Avital is also used as a surname.

Etymology 
"Abital" translates to dewy (as in, morning dew) or my father is [the] dew (Ab-i means "my father"; -i is possessive pronoun for "my").

The name refers to dew, the phenomenon of water droplets that occur on exposed objects in the morning or evening due to condensation.

Place name 
The surname could potentially be a place name for the Avital moshav in Israel, named in 1953. 

Alternatively, Mount Avital/Tall Abu an Nada (Hebrew: הר אביטל, Har Avital, Arabic: تل أبو الندى, Tall Abu an Nada) is a mountain that is part of a dormant volcano in the Golan Heights. It does not appear to have any correlation with the Avital moshav, being over an hour's drive away.

Biblical character 

The name was popularized by minor biblical character Abital, who is mentioned in the book of Samuel as one of King David's wives (II Samuel 3:4).

Abital gave birth to David's fifth son, Shephatiah, another minor biblical character.

People

As given name (female) 
 Avital Sharansky, a Ukrainian activist and public figure in the Soviet Jewry Movement.
 Avital Ronell, an American professor.
 Avital Leibovich, director of the American Jewish Committee (AJC) in Israel.
 Avital Abergel, an Israeli actress.

As given name (male) 
 Avital Boruchovsky, an Israeli chess player.
 Avital Inbar, an Israeli author.
 Avital Selinger, an Israeli volleyball player.
 Avital Tamir, an Israeli musician.

As surname
 Mili Avital, an Israeli actress, writer, and director.
 Shay Avital, Major General (Ret.) in the IDF and former head of the Special Operations Forces Command (Depth Corps).
 Omer Avital, an Israeli-American jazz bassist, composer and bandleader.
 Avi Avital, an Israeli mandolinist.
 Tsion Avital, an Israeli philosopher of art and culture.
 Eden Avital, an Israeli footballer.
 Colette Avital, a Romani-Israeli diplomat and politician.
 Dr. Doron Avital, an Israeli politician.
 Shmuel Avital, an Israeli politician.

References 

Given names
Surnames
Hebrew-language_given_names
Hebrew_unisex_given_names
Hebrew_feminine_given_names
Hebrew_masculine_given_names

11th-century BC women
10th-century BC women
Wives of David